Steven L. Marmel (born December 17, 1964) is an American television writer, producer, and stand-up comedian who has worked on many animated television series, including The Fairly OddParents, I Am Weasel, Danny Phantom, Family Guy and Yin Yang Yo!. During his work on The Fairly OddParents he frequently co-wrote episodes with Butch Hartman. Marmel also created the series Sonny with a Chance, So Random as well as the  series Mech-X4.

Career
Marmel had been a stand-up comedian since the age of 18, and was discovered while performing in 1996 by a Hanna-Barbera executive who thought he'd be ideal as a writer for Johnny Bravo. He has since worked on numerous other shows for Hanna-Barbera, Nickelodeon, and Disney Channel, and has been nominated for multiple Emmy and Annie Awards for his work as a writer, producer, and songwriter. He has also been noted by the conservative magazine The American Spectator for his animated TV series This Just In!

Personal life
Marmel grew up in Lincolnwood, Illinois and is an alumnus of the University of Wisconsin, where he majored in journalism. Marmel and his wife currently reside in Los Angeles.

Television work

Animated series
Johnny Bravo (1996–97) (staff writer: story & teleplay)
Cow and Chicken (1997–98) (staff writer)
I Am Weasel (1997–99) (staff writer)
Monster Farm (1998) (writer)
Oh Yeah! Cartoons (1998) (prop designer) & (writer) (1999)
Ace Ventura: Pet Detective (TV series) (1999) (writer)
Family Guy (1999) (punch-up guy)
The Fairly OddParents (2001–06) (story, story editor, writer & producer)
The Adventures of Jimmy Neutron: Boy Genius (2002) (writer)
ChalkZone (2002) (writer) & (producer) (2003–08)
Danny Phantom (2004–07) (story, story editor, writer (2004–06), producer (2004–07) & (developer)
This Just In (2004) (creator, writer & executive producer)
Yin Yang Yo! (2006–09) (story, writer & producer)
Family Guy (2013–14) (writer & producer)

Live-action series
Jeff Dunham: Spark of Insanity (2007, TV special) (producer)
Sonny with a Chance (2009–11) (creator, writer & executive producer)
So Random! (2011–12) (creator, writer & executive producer)
Jeff Dunham: Minding the Monsters (2012, TV special) (producer)
Red Light Comedy: Live From Amsterdam (2012) (consulting producer)
Mech-X4 (2016–18) (creator, writer & executive producer)
Pup Academy (2019) (creative consultant)

Stand-up comedy
The Tonight Show with Jay Leno (3 episodes in 2004)

Film work
Achmed Saves America (2014, TV movie) (writer)
Smosh: The Movie (2015, Adventure comedy film web film) (writer)
Darci Lynne: My Hometown Christmas (2018) (additional material)

References

External links

Steve Marmel on TV.com

American male comedians
American male television writers
Television producers from Illinois
University of Wisconsin–Madison School of Journalism & Mass Communication alumni
Living people
1964 births
People from Lincolnwood, Illinois
Screenwriters from Illinois
Comedians from Illinois
Showrunners
21st-century American comedians
21st-century American screenwriters
21st-century American male writers